This is a shortened version of the fourth chapter of the ICD-9: Diseases of the Blood and Blood-forming Organs. It covers ICD codes 280 to 289. The full chapter can be found on pages 167 to 175 of Volume 1, which contains all (sub)categories of the ICD-9. Volume 2 is an alphabetical index of Volume 1. Both volumes can be downloaded for free from the website of the World Health Organization.



Anemia (280–285)
  Iron deficiency anemias
  Iron deficiency anemia secondary to blood loss (chronic)
  Iron deficiency anemia secondary to inadequate dietary iron intake
  Other specified iron deficiency anemias
  Iron deficiency anemia, unspecified
  Other deficiency anemias
  pernicious anemia
  Anemia, folate deficiency
  Other specified megaloblastic anemias, not elsewhere classified
  Hereditary hemolytic anemias
  Hereditary spherocytosis
  G6PD
  Sickle-cell trait
  Sickle-cell anemia
  Acquired hemolytic anemias
  Autoimmune hemolytic anemias
 Warm autoimmune hemolytic anemia
  Non-autoimmune hemolytic anemias
  Hemoglobinuria due to hemolysis from external causes
 Paroxysmal nocturnal hemoglobinuria
  Aplastic anemia
  Constitutional aplastic anemia
  Constitutional red blood cell aplasia
  Other constitutional aplastic anemia
  Pancytopenia
  Myelophthisis
  Other specified aplastic anemias
  Other specified aplastic anemias
  Red cell aplasia
  Aplastic anemia unspecified
  Other and unspecified anemias
  Sideroblastic anemia
  Acute posthemorrhagic anemia
  Anemia in chronic illness
  Anemia in chronic kidney disease
  Anemia in neoplastic disease
  Anemia of other chronic illness
  Antineoplastic chemotherapy induced anemia
  Other specified anemias
  Anemia unspecified

Coagulation/hemorrhagic (286–287)
  Coagulation defects
  Hemophilia A
  Hemophilia B
  Hemophilia C
  Congenital deficiency of other clotting factors
 Factor XIII deficiency
  Von Willebrand's disease
  Hemorrhagic disorder due to intrinsic anticoagulants
  Defibrination syndrome
  Acquired coagulation factor deficiency
  Coagulation defects, other
  Purpura and other hemorrhagic conditions
  Allergic purpura
 Henoch–Schönlein purpura
  Thrombocytopenia, primary
  Immune thrombocytopenic purpura
 Idiopathic thrombocytopenic purpura
  Thrombocytopenia, secondary
  Hemorrhagic conditions, unspec.

Other (288–289)
  Diseases of white blood cells
  Leukopenia
  Functional disorders of polymorphonuclear neutrophils
  Genetic anomalies of leukocytes
  Eosinophilia
  Hemophagocytic syndromes
  Decreased white blood cell count
  Leukocytopenia, unspecified
  Lymphocytopenia
  Elevated white blood cell count
  Leukocytosis, unspecified
  Lymphocytosis (symptomatic)
  Leukemoid reaction
  Monocytosis (symptomatic)
  Plasmacytosis
  Basophilia
  Bandemia
  Other specified disease of white blood cells
  Abnormal white blood cells, unspec.
  Other diseases of blood and blood-forming organs
  Secondary polycythemia
  Chronic lymphadenitis
  Nonspecific mesenteric lymphadenitis
  Lymphadenitis unspecified except mesenteric
  Hypersplenism
  Other diseases of spleen
  Disease of spleen unspecified
  Chronic congestive splenomegaly
  Splenic sequestration
  Neutropenic splenomegaly
  Other diseases of spleen
  Familial polycythemia
  Methemoglobinemia
  Other specified diseases of blood and blood-forming organs
  Primary hypercoagulable state
  Secondary hypercoagulable state
  Myelofibrosis
  Heparin-induced thrombocytopenia
  Other specified diseases of blood and blood-forming organs
  Unspecified diseases of blood and blood-forming organs

International Classification of Diseases